J. indica may refer to:

 Jerdonia indica, the Indian violet, an erect shrub
 Juniperus indica, the black juniper, a species of coniferous tree